Tagoloan, officially the Municipality of Tagoloan (Maranao: Inged a Tagoloan) and also known as Tagoloan II, is a 4th class municipality in the province of Lanao del Sur, Philippines. According to the 2020 census, it has a population of 12,602 people.

Etymology
Tagoloan is a compound word composed of Maranao terms tago, referring to something inside i.e. inhabitants, and oloan, "leader", referring to Sultan Sharif Alawi.

Sharif Alawi established the Sultanate of Tagoloan in 1500. Some local historians say it was in the year 1515 while his younger brother Sultan Sharif Kabunsuan was enthroned as the First Sultan of Maguindanao in the year 1520 (see Confederation of sultanates in Lanao).

Sharif Alawi and Sharif Kabunsuan came from Johore, a state in Malaysia and first landed in Mindanao in the year 1475 at an islet (now Agutayan reef, in Jasaan, Misamis Oriental, visible from the seaport of the Municipality of Tagoloan in the Province of Misamis Oriental, Northern Mindanao. The brothers arrived in Mindanao in the year 1464

Sultan Sharif Alawi spread Islam (prior to the arrival of Christianity in Philippine in 1521), in this town towards Surigao, Butuan, Bukidnon, Davao, Lanao del Sur and Norte, stretching towards Misamis Occidental in western Mindanao. Sultan Sharif Kabunsuan only preached Islam in Maguindanao.

Geography
It is situated in the northern part of the Province of Lanao del Sur, containing a total land area of 60,214 hectares, more or less. This area is based on the territorial jurisdiction covered by those barangays (39 Barangays) named in the Presidential Decree 1548 dated June 11, 1978, otherwise known as the "charter creation of the Municipality of Tagoloan in the Province of Lanao del Sur" which hereby described as follows;

Bounded on the east by the Cagayan River (Talakag, Bukidnon); on the south by Bubong, Lanao del Sur; on the south-west by Kapai, Lanao del Sur, and Tagoloan, Lanao del Norte; on the west by Iligan; on the north by Cagayan de Oro.

Barangays
Tagoloan is politically subdivided into thirty-nine (39) barangays under the P.D. 1548 dated June 11, 1978 and was then reduced into nineteen (19) barangays, as affected by E.O. No. 108, Series of 1986 namely, are;

Climate

Demographics

Economy

References

External links
 Tagoloan Profile at the DTI Cities and Municipalities Competitive Index
 [ Philippine Standard Geographic Code]
 Philippine Census Information
 Local Governance Performance Management System

Municipalities of Lanao del Sur
Establishments by Philippine presidential decree